La Encrucijada Biosphere Reserve (established 2006) is a UNESCO Biosphere Reserve situated in the Pacific Coastal Lowlands physiographic region of Mexico. It covers  stretching over six municipalities in the Costa de Chiapas (Pijijiapan, Mapastepec, Acapetahua, Villa Comaltitlan, Huixtla and Mazatán). It is composed of two large coastal lagoon systems that correspond to two core areas (La Encricijada and Palmarcito), and a wide variety of natural ecosystems including mangroves, zapotonales, tule swamps and marshes, as well as patches of tropical seasonal forest, coastal dunes and palm trees.

Eleven major rivers and their tributaries enter this ecosystem forming coastal lagoons where freshwater is mixed with sea water and the main activity is shrimp fishing. Biological diversity and richness of the site is extraordinary and includes a number of wildlife species such as jaguars, river crocodiles and alligators, spider monkeys, and more than three hundred species of birds, one hundred of which are migratory.

Approximately 29,300 people live in the biosphere reserve and are mainly engaged in four economic activities: fishing, agriculture, stockbreeding, and tourism.
 

Sources

References 

Biosphere reserves of Mexico
Protected areas of Chiapas
Ramsar sites in Mexico
Important Bird Areas of Mexico